Meritxell is a village in Andorra, located in the parish of Encamp in the north of the country near the French border. Our Lady of Meritxell is the patron saint of Andorra.

In the village is the Basilica of Our Lady of Meritxell, which replaces the original Romanesque style sanctuary burnt down in a fire in 1972. It houses a replica of the Romanesque carving of the Virgin that was also destroyed in the fire.

References

Populated places in Andorra
Canillo